Monroe Township is one of the thirteen townships of Henry County, Ohio, United States. As of the 2010 census the population was 1,142, of whom 877 lived in the unincorporated portion of the township.

Geography
Located in the central part of the county, it borders the following townships:
Harrison Township - north
Damascus Township - northeast corner
Richfield Township - east
Bartlow Township - southeast corner
Marion Township - south
Pleasant Township - southwest corner
Napoleon Township - west
Flatrock Township - northwest corner

Monroe Township is one of only two townships in the county without a border on another county.

The village of Malinta is located in northeastern Monroe Township, and the unincorporated community of Grelton lies on its border with Richfield Township.

Name and history
It is one of twenty-two Monroe Townships statewide.

Government
The township is governed by a three-member board of trustees, who are elected in November of odd-numbered years to a four-year term beginning on the following January 1. Two are elected in the year after the presidential election and one is elected in the year before it. There is also an elected township fiscal officer, who serves a four-year term beginning on April 1 of the year after the election, which is held in November of the year before the presidential election. Vacancies in the fiscal officership or on the board of trustees are filled by the remaining trustees.

References

External links
County website

Townships in Henry County, Ohio
Townships in Ohio